Kobold Hall is an adventure for fantasy role-playing games published by Mayfair Games in 1983.

Contents
Kobold Hall is a dungeon adventure in which the player characters must collect all the Eyes of the Hydra.

Publication history
Kobold Hall was written by Bill Fawcett, and was published by Mayfair Games in 1983 as a 32-page book with an outer folder.

The adventure was produced in a limited edition of 750 copies for Origins 1983, which was held in Cobo Hall, Detroit.

Reception

Reviews

References

Fantasy role-playing game adventures
Role Aids
Role-playing game supplements introduced in 1983